The Rwandan Ambassador to the United States is the official representative of the Government of Rwanda to the Government of the United States and is head of the Embassy of Rwanda in Washington, D.C.

List of representatives

References 

 
United States
Rwanda